Lieutenant Willward Alexander Sandys-Clarke VC (8 June 1919 – 23 April 1943) was a British Army officer and an English recipient of the Victoria Cross, the highest and most prestigious award for gallantry in the face of the enemy that can be awarded to British and Commonwealth forces.

Background
He was born in Southport, and was educated at Uppingham School. He married Dorothy Irene Deakin at the United Reformed Church in Belmont, Lancashire in 1941, and they lived in Egerton, near Bolton.

Details
Sandys-Clarke was a 23-year-old lieutenant in the 1st Battalion, Loyal Regiment (North Lancashire), British Army during the Second World War when he was awarded the VC.

On 23 April 1943 at Guiriat El Atach, Tunisia, Lieutenant Clarke's company was counter-attacked and almost wiped out, he being the sole remaining officer. Although wounded in the head, he gathered a composite platoon together and advancing to attack the position again met heavy fire from a machine-gun post. He manoeuvred his men to give covering fire and then tackled the post single-handed, killing or capturing the crew and knocking out the gun. He dealt similarly with two other posts and then led his platoon to the objective, but was killed when he later went forward to tackle two sniper posts single-handed.

Further information
Sandys-Clarke was related to four other recipients of the award: 
 Gen. Walter Congreve (Colenso)
 Frederick Roberts, 1st Earl Roberts (Khudaganj)
 Lt. Frederick Roberts (Colenso)
 Maj. William Congreve (Somme)

The medal is retained by his family and is not on public display.

References

 British VCs of World War 2 (John Laffin, 1997)
 Monuments to Courage (David Harvey, 1999)
 The Register of the Victoria Cross (This England, 1997)

External links
 Commonwealth War Graves Commission for Willward Alexander Sandys-Clarke
 

1919 births
1943 deaths
People from Southport
Loyal Regiment officers
British World War II recipients of the Victoria Cross
British Army personnel killed in World War II
People educated at Uppingham School
British Army recipients of the Victoria Cross
Military personnel from Lancashire